Granuaile is a blend of Classical and Irish Folk Music written by Shaun Davey for singer Rita Connolly.  It is based on the life and times of the 16th century Irish pirate queen Gráinne O'Mally, who was also known as Granuaile.  The album was recorded using a 35 piece chamber orchestra joined by uilleann pipe soloist Liam O'Flynn, acoustic guitar, Irish harp and percussion, and special guest Donal Lunny on bouzouki.

Tracks
 Dubhdarra 
 Ripples in the Rockpools 
 The Defence of Hen's Castle
 Free and Easy 
 The Rescue of Hugh De lacy
 Hen's March 
 Death of Richard-an-Iarainn (Intro) 
 Death of Richard an-Iarainn 
 Sir Richard Bingham
 The Spanish Armada
 The New Age

Musicians
Conductor : Gareth Hudson
Vocals : Rita Connolly
Uilleann Pipes : Liam O'Flynn
Des Moore : guitar
Helen Davies : concert and Irish harps
Noel Eccles : percussion
Carl Geraghty : saxes
Marian Doherty : harpsichord
Donal Lunny : bouzouki

References
Record Label Catalogue 2009
Album Sleevenotes 
Album press release

1985 albums
Shaun Davey albums
Rita Connolly albums
Cultural depictions of Irish women